Veti may refer to:

 Veti, Dahanu, a village in Maharashtra, India
 Vêti, a French clothing shop
 AS Veti, a football club in Congo